Blue Hills, created and written by Gwen Meredith, is an Australian radio serial about the lives of families, set in a fictional typical Australian country town called Tanimbla. The title  "Blue Hills" itself derives from the residence of Dr. Gordon, the town's doctor.

Blue Hills was broadcast by the Australian Broadcasting Commission (ABC) for 27 years, from 28 February 1949 to 30 September 1976. It ran for a total of 5,795 episodes, and was at one time the world's longest-running radio serial. Each episode lasted 15 minutes. It succeeded another Gwen Meredith serial The Lawsons, with many of the same themes and characters, and which ran for 1,299 episodes.

History: background 
The Lawsons was the brainchild of play editor Leslie Rees and Frank Clewlow of the Australian Broadcasting Corporation (then Commission), which had been approached by Government in 1943 to publicise the need for farmers to grow more soya beans as part of the war effort. They reasoned that a popular radio programme would be more effective than ordinary propaganda, and approached Gwen Meredith to write a radio drama. She was an unlikely choice as she lived in Melbourne and production was to be in Sydney, and she was a city girl with little knowledge of primary production. But she accepted the contract from the ABC's Rural Department and spent some weeks on a sheep station in Gunnedah to gather background. The show went to air on 21 February 1944 and slowly achieved a loyal country audience. The story revolved around the farmer John Lawson (Vivian Edwards), his wife Ellen (Ailsa Grahame), and their 19-year-old daughter Sue, played by Jane Holland. The original remit was extended to enable modern farming methods and seasonal information to be passed on to farmers, as well as the usual fare of soap operas. As the war ended, Grahame and Holland left for England, and were replaced by Ethel Lang and Joan Lord. Under producer Charles Wheeler, who insisted of actors that they use a natural conversation style rather than stage voices, the show lasted five years before it was terminated, at Meredith's request, to make way for a similar program of greater scope. The last episode of The Lawsons was aired on 25 February 1949, a Friday, and Blue Hills commenced the following Monday, 28 February 1949.

Production and broadcast 
Blue Hills was broadcast from the ABC's capital city stations 2FC, 3AR, 4QG, 5CL, 7ZL and their regional networks at 1 pm AET and repeated, for city listeners, at 6:45 pm, Monday to Friday, though the Friday episode was dropped in 1954. Due to limitations imposed by the telecommunications of the time (and no doubt also the two-hour time difference), it was initially broadcast only in the Eastern States and South Australia. 5DR Darwin (later 8DR) began broadcasting the program in September 1952, and 6WF Perth and Western Australian regional stations began in January 1955, using transcription discs and, later, magnetic tape sourced from Sydney. The duration of each episode was 15 minutes apart from the finale, which needed 30 minutes to round up each character. The first words spoken in the first episode were by Queenie Ashton as Mrs Gordon, and as Granny Bishop the last words ("good bye") in the final episode some 27 years later.

Actors 
Among the many Sydney actors, perhaps hundreds, who played in Blue Hills were:

Producers included:
 Frank Harvey
 Robert Montgomery
 Eric John, to whom Gwen Meredith credited much of the show's success.

Signature tune 
The famous opening signature tune was taken from a short orchestral piece called Pastorale by the British composer Ronald Hanmer.  Until Hanmer moved to Australia in 1975, he had no idea that his work had been used by the ABC and had become so famous in Australia (although few Australians could have identified its composer). He later re-worked this short piece into a longer orchestral work titled Blue Hills Rhapsody, which he recorded with the Queensland Symphony Orchestra. The recording first used was played by the New Century Orchestra.

Books 

Several books based on the show were written by Gwen Meredith:
The Lawsons (1948)
Blue Hills, Angus and Robertson (1950)
Beyond Blue Hills (1953)
Into the Sun (1961)

In preparing the radio serial Blue Hills for publication I have not been set such a formidable task as faced me with The Lawsons, since up to the present date Blue Hills  has been presented by the Australian Broadcasting Commission for little more than a year. This means a mere half million words to contend with! But since the publisher sets a defensive maximum of eighty thousand words, intending readers should be warned—and perhaps heartened by the warning—that in that editing, a great deal has perforce been discarded. However, I think the main elements and characters have survived the massacre and the book brings the story to the point reached on air at the time of writing. GWEN MEREDITH. (Author's note, Blue Hills (1950))

See also 
 The Archers – the present 'world's longest running radio soap opera' (it has broadcast over 19,200 episodes up to 2019).

Notes

References

External links 
 Listen to the theme from Blue Hills on australianscreen online
 The theme from Blue Hills was added to the National Film and Sound Archive's Sounds of Australia registry in 2008.
 Visit the National Film and Sound Archive of Australia's Women in Early Radio collection for more information about the history of women in radio in Australia, including Queenie Ashton, Ethel Lang, Amber Mae Cecil and Grace Gibson.

1949 establishments in Australia
1976 disestablishments
Australian Broadcasting Corporation radio programs
Australian radio dramas